Keith Trotter (born 18 January 1962) is a former English cricketer.  Trotter was a right-handed batsman who bowled right-arm fast-medium.  He was born in Silksworth, County Durham.

Trotter made his debut for Durham against Cumberland in 1988 Minor Counties Championship.  He played Minor counties cricket for Durham in 1988 and 1989, making 3 Minor Counties Championship appearances.  He made his only List A appearance against Middlesex in the 1989 NatWest Trophy.  In this match, he took the wickets of Mike Gatting and Mark Ramprakash for the cost of 60 runs from 12 overs, while with the bat he was dismissed for 4 runs by Ricardo Ellcock.

References

External links
Keith Trotter at ESPNcricinfo
Keith Trotter at CricketArchive

1962 births
Living people
People from County Durham (before 1974)
Cricketers from Tyne and Wear
English cricketers
Durham cricketers